There have been two baronetcies created for members of the Nairn family, both in the Baronetage of the United Kingdom.

The Nairn Baronetcy, of Rankeilour, Collessie, and Dysart House, Dysart, in the County of Fife, was created in the Baronetage of the United Kingdom on 16 December 1904 for the Scottish businessman Michael Nairn. He was Chairman of Michael Nairn & Co, linoleum manufacturers, of Kirkcaldy, and of the Nairn Linoleum Co, of Kearny, United States.

The Spencer-Nairn Baronetcy, of Monimail in the County of Fife, was created in the Baronetage of the United Kingdom on 20 January 1933 for Robert Spencer-Nairn, a Major in the Fife and Forfar Yeomanry. Born Robert Nairn, he was the second son of the first Baronet of the 1904 creation by his wife Emily Frances, daughter of Alfred Rimington Spencer. In 1928 he adopted the additional surname of Spencer.

Nairn baronets, of Rankeilour and Dysart House (1904)
Sir Michael Barker Nairn, 1st Baronet (1838–1915)
Sir Michael Nairn, 2nd Baronet (1874–1952)
Sir (Michael) George Nairn, 3rd Baronet (1911–1984)
Sir Michael Nairn, 4th Baronet (born 1938)

Spencer-Nairn baronets, of Monimail (1933)
Sir Robert Spencer-Nairn, 1st Baronet (1880–1960)
Sir Douglas Leslie Spencer-Nairn, 2nd Baronet (1906–1970)
Sir Robert Arnold Spencer-Nairn, 3rd Baronet (born 1933)

See also
Nairne baronets

References
Kidd, Charles, Williamson, David (editors). Debrett's Peerage and Baronetage (1990 edition). New York: St Martin's Press, 1990.

Baronetcies in the Baronetage of the United Kingdom